Oreopasites is a genus of cuckoo bees in the family Apidae. There are about 11 described species in Oreopasites.

Species
These 11 species belong to the genus Oreopasites:
 Oreopasites albinota Linsley, 1941
 Oreopasites arizonica Linsley, 1941
 Oreopasites barbarae Rozen, 1992 (Barbara's oreopasites)
 Oreopasites collegarum Rozen, 1992
 Oreopasites euphorbiae Cockerell, 1929
 Oreopasites favreauae Rozen, 1992
 Oreopasites hurdi Rozen, 1992
 Oreopasites linsleyi Rozen, 1992
 Oreopasites powelli Rozen, 1992
 Oreopasites scituli Cockerell, 1906
 Oreopasites vanduzeei Cockerell, 1925

References

Further reading

 

Nomadinae
Articles created by Qbugbot